The Australian five-cent coin (Nickel) (originally called a "zac") is the lowest-denomination circulating coin of the decimal Australian dollar introduced in 14 February 1966, replacing the pre-decimal sixpence. It has been the lowest-denomination coin in general circulation since the withdrawal of the one-cent and two-cent coins in 1992.

Due to inflation, the purchasing power of the five-cent coin continues to drop, and as of 2018 represents 0.27% of the country's minimum hourly wage for workers age 21 or over.

The coin was introduced into circulation on 14 February 1966. In its first year of minting, 30 million were struck at the British Royal Mint (then in London), in addition to 45.4 million at the Royal Australian Mint in Canberra. Since then, with the exception of 1981, the coin has been produced exclusively in Canberra. In 1981, 50.3 million were produced at the Royal Mint's new headquarters in Llantrisant, Wales, and 50 million at the Royal Canadian Mint in Winnipeg, in addition to 62 million in Canberra.

The reverse side depicts an echidna and the obverse side the head of state, Queen Elizabeth II. The only commemorative coin in this denomination was issued in 2016 to commemorate the 50th anniversary of decimal currency. 

This coin has the highest mintage of any current coins and doesn't circulate well because of its value, like the euro one-cent. The lowest mintage was 8.25 million coins in 1972, and the highest was 306.5 million in 2006. No coins were issued in 1985–86, however, only minted for coin sets.

There has been some debate about removing this coin from circulation as with the New Zealand dollar mainly as stated for its low value and high costs. On 23 May 2009, Fairfax newspapers reported that the Royal Australian Mint planned to scrap the coin.

In May 2007, owing to the high market value of copper and nickel, the bullion value of the coin was about 6.5 cents, though there were no reported cases of hoarding or melting down of the coins despite the apparent 30% gross profit to be made from doing so. Market prices as at June 2018 are about $7/kg for copper and $15/kg for nickel, making the metal content of the 5¢ coin worth only 2.5¢ or 50% of its face value (about the same as for a 10¢ or 20¢ coin). The production cost of the coin was reported to be 12¢.

5c coins are legal tender for amounts not exceeding $5 for any payment of a debt.

See also

 Coins of the Australian dollar

References

External links
 Australian Decimal Currency, www.australianstamp.com
 2001 Large and Small Obverse 5cent
 Coins from Australia / Coin Type: Five Cents, Online Coin Club
 5 Cents KM# 80, coinscatalog.net

Five-cent coins
Decimal coins of Australia
Currencies introduced in 1966